Mordellistena aequalica is a species of beetle in the genus Mordellistena of the family Mordellidae. It was discovered in 1977 and is endemic to Hungary.

References

aequalica
Beetles described in 1977
Beetles of Europe
Endemic fauna of Hungary